Bulinus truncatus is a species of air-breathing freshwater snail with a sinistral shell, an aquatic pulmonate gastropod mollusk in the subfamily Bulininae of the family Bulinidae, the ram's horn snails and the like. 

Subspecies
 Bulinus truncatus contortus (Michaud, 1829) (synonym:  Physa contorta Michaud, 1829 )
 Bulinus truncatus rivularis (Philippi, 1836)
 Bulinus truncatus truncatus (Audouin, 1827)

Distribution
Distribution of Bulinus truncatus include:
Africa: Egypt, Morocco Northern Sahara, D.R. Congo, Malawi and Ethiopia. 
  in Ferlo Valley, Western Africa: Senegal
  in El Ejido (province of Almeria, southern Andalusia), lagoon of Villena (province of Alicante, northern Catalonia, Spain
 Continental France and Corsica 
 Continental Greece and Crete 
 Italy (Sardinia and Sicily) 
 Portugal 
 Malta
 Middle East (Iran, Iraq and Saudi Arabia, Jordan, Israel and Yemen).

Parasites 
This species is an intermediate host for Schistosoma haematobium and Paramphistomum cervi and Paramphistomum microbothrium.

References

 Audouin, V. (1828). Explication sommaire des planches de Mollusques de l'Egypte et de la Syrie publiées par J.C. Savigny. in: Description de l'Egypte ou recueil des observations et des recherches qui ont été faites en Egypte pendant l'expédition de l'armée française, publié par les ordres de sa majesté l'empereur Napoléon le grand. 2ème édition, dédiée au roi. Histoire Naturelle, Animaux invertébrés 22: 117-212. Paris: Panckouke. 
 Preston, H.B. (1913). New species and varieties of terrestrial and fluviatile shells from Equatorial Africa. Revue de Zoologie Africaine, 3 (1): 47-62, 212, pl. 4-6. Bruxelles 
 Neubert, E. (1998). Annotated checklist of the terrestrial and freshwater molluscs of the Arabian Peninsula with descriptions of new species. Fauna of Arabia. 17: 333-461.

Further reading 
 
 
 .

External links 
 Die Familie der Limnaeiden enthaltend die Genera Planorbis, Limnaeus, Physa und Amphipeplea. In Abbildungen nach der Natur mit Beschreibungen. In: Küster, H. C.; Kobelt, W., Weinkauff, H. C., eds. Systematisches Conchylien-Cabinet von Martini und Chemnitz, Neue Folgen. Ersten Bandes, siebenzehnte Abtheilung (A). (1) 17a (270): 29-34, 35a, 36a (1878); (1) 17a (319): 63-94, pls. 11-15, 17 (1882); (1) 17a (320): 95-110, pls. 18-22 (1883); (1) 17a (328): 111-150, pls. 23-27 (1884); (1) 17a (331): 151-182, pls. 28-33 (1884); (1) 17a (332): 183-222, pls. 34-39 (1884); (1) 17a (334): 223-278, pls. 40-44 (1885); (1) 17a (336): 279-310, pls. 45-50 (1885); (1) 17a (338): 311-358, pls. 51-55 (1886); (1) 17a (339): 359-430 (1886). Nürnberg (Bauer & Raspe)
 Dautzenberg, Ph. (1890). Récoltes malacologiques de M. le Capitaine Em. Dorr dans le Haut-Sénégal et le Soudan Français de 1886 à 1889. Mem. Soc. Zool. France III: 125-135, plate I
 Bourguignat, J.-R. (1888). Iconographie malacologique des animaux mollusques fluviatiles du lac Tanganika. 1-82, pls 1-35. Corbeil (Crété)
 Germain, L. (1907). Contributions à la faune malacologique de l'Afrique équatoriale. Bulletin du Muséum National d'Histoire Naturelle. 13(1): 64-68
  Jickeli, C. F. (1874). Fauna der Land- und Süsswasser-Mollusken Nord-Ost-Afrika's (Die erste Abtheilung der wissenschaftlichen Resultate seiner Reise mit einschliessend). Nova Acta der Kaiserlichen Leopoldinisch-Carolinischen Deutschen Akademie der Naturforscher. 37 (1): 1-352, 11 plates. Halle
 Fischer, P. (1891). Diagnoses d'espèces nouvelles recueillies, à l'état subfossile, dans le Sahara, près d'El-Goléah. Journal de Conchyliologie. 38(4): 374-376.
 Glöer, P. & Pešić, V. (2012). The freshwater snails (Gastropoda) of Iran, with descriptions of two new genera and eight new species. ZooKeys. 219: 11-61. Sofia
 "Species summary for Bulinus truncatus". AnimalBase

Bulinus
Gastropods described in 1827